John Bernard Graham (December 24, 1916 – December 30, 1998) was an American professional baseball first baseman. He played in Major League Baseball for the Brooklyn Dodgers, New York Giants, and St. Louis Browns between 1946 and 1949.

He died at age 82 in Los Alamitos, California.

His father, Peaches Graham, also played in the majors.

See also
List of second-generation Major League Baseball players

References

External links

Interview

1916 births
1998 deaths
Major League Baseball first basemen
Brooklyn Dodgers players
St. Louis Browns players
New York Giants (NL) players
Baseball players from Minnesota
Minor league baseball managers
Akron Yankees players
Norfolk Tars players
Binghamton Triplets players
Newark Bears (IL) players
Oklahoma City Indians players
Fort Worth Cats players
Montreal Royals players
Jersey City Giants players
San Diego Padres (minor league) players
San Francisco Seals (baseball) players
Baltimore Orioles (IL) players
Modesto Reds players
Pacific Coast League MVP award winners